Ehsan Ul Haq Bajwa is a Pakistani politician who has been a member of the National Assembly of Pakistan since August 2018. Previously he was a Member of the Provincial Assembly of the Punjab, from May 2013 to May 2018.

Early life and education
He was born on 4 March 1972 in Bahawalnagar.

He received a Diploma in Associate Engineering from Government College of Technology, Bahawalpur in 1992. During his student life, he was part of ATI (Anjuman e Tulba e Islam). ATI was involved in roguery in schools and was an aly of politicians. He was also involved in such activities and was beaten by other student organization several times.

Political career

He was elected to the Provincial Assembly of the Punjab as a candidate of Pakistan Muslim League (N) (PML-N) from Constituency PP-281 (Bahawalnagar-V) in 2013 Pakistani general election.

He was elected to the National Assembly of Pakistan as a candidate of PML-N from Constituency NA-168 (Bahawalnagar-III) in 2018 Pakistani general election.

References

Living people
1972 births
Punjab MPAs 2013–2018
Pakistani MNAs 2018–2023
Pakistan Muslim League (N) MPAs (Punjab)
Pakistan Muslim League (N) MNAs
Punjabi people
People from Bahawalnagar District